Bharathinagar was one of the 225 constituencies in the Karnataka Legislative Assembly of Karnataka a south state of India. It was also part of Bangalore Central Lok Sabha constituency. It was abolished in 2008 and to form a new Vidhan Sabha seat territorially, called Sarvagnanagar.

Member of Legislative Assembly
 1967: M. A. Amalorpavam, Indian National Congress 
 1972: D. Poosalingam, Independent
 1978: Michael Fernandes, Janata Party
 1983: Michael Fernandes, Janata Party
 1985: K. J. George, Indian National Congress 
 1989: K. J. George, Indian National Congress 
 1994: N. Rajanna, Janata Dal
 1999: J. Alexander, Indian National Congress 
 2004: Nirmal Surana, Bharatiya Janata Party

See also
 Bharathinagar
 Bangalore district
 List of constituencies of Karnataka Legislative Assembly

References

Former assembly constituencies of Karnataka